Sebastian Darius Velcotă (born 20 March 1998) is a Romanian professional footballer who plays as a midfielder for Liga III club CSM Reșița.

Honours
ACS Poli Timișoara
Liga II: 2014–15

CSM Reșița
Liga III: 2018–19, 2021–22

References

External links
 
 

1998 births
Living people
People from Caraș-Severin County
Romanian footballers
Association football midfielders
Romania youth international footballers
Liga I players
Liga II players
Liga III players
ACS Poli Timișoara players
CSM Lugoj players
CSM Reșița players
CSM Deva players
CS Pandurii Târgu Jiu players